Wellesley is a subway station on Line 1 Yonge–University in Toronto, Ontario, Canada. It is located on Wellesley Street East, east of Yonge Street. Wi-Fi service is available at this station.

History
The address given for this listing of 16 Wellesley Street East/15 Dundonald Street, which differs from the TTC address, more accurately describes the location of the station structure which runs between those streets, to the rear of the properties fronting on the east side of Yonge Street.

On February 6, 2006, the only baby to be born on the subway, Mary Kim of Scarborough, was delivered on the Wellesley platform. Her mother Sun Hee Paik took the subway with her family to St. Michael's Hospital from their Scarborough home. She did not make it to the downtown hospital, going into labour on the train. Her husband delivered the baby after they disembarked at Wellesley and Toronto EMS arrived later to help finish the birth and send the mother and child to St. Michael's. TTC officials later promised to provide Mary with lifetime transit access.

Construction began in early 2018 to make the station fully accessible, including the addition of two elevators and accessible fare gates. On July 22, 2020, the station became accessible with the completion of the elevator construction. As part of the enhancements for accessibility, provision was made for the future installation of an artwork on the curved wall opposite the two new elevators.

Wellesley was the last downtown TTC subway station with only one street entrance. In July 2020, a secondary entrance was opened on Dundonald Street (entry or exit here is by Presto card or Presto ticket only).

Station description
This station is located on the north side of Wellesley Street East east of Yonge Street. It is built on two levels, with the main Wellesley Street entrance and bus platform at street level and the subway platforms located on the lower level. There are elevators from street level to the two platforms. A Gateway Newstands can be found in the station. There is a second automatic entrance on Dundonald Street.

Subway infrastructure in the vicinity

North of the station the tunnel was constructed by cut and cover into Bloor station, where it crosses over Yonge station on Line 2 Bloor–Danforth. South of the station, the tunnel is mostly of a similar construction towards College station. The strip of land occupied by this section of the subway is distinguished by being used mainly for public parks or parking lots.

Surface connections

 94A Wellesley westbound to Ossington station and eastbound to Castle Frank station
 94B Wellesley eastbound to Castle Frank station
Bus routes below can be boarded at a curbside stop with a valid transfer.
 97B Yonge northbound to York Mills station and southbound to Queens Quay
 320 Yonge Blue Night northbound to Steeles Avenue
 320 Yonge Blue Night southbound to Queens Quay

References

External links

Line 1 Yonge–University stations
Railway stations in Canada opened in 1954